The Laoshan goat breed from the Shandong Province of China is used for the production of milk.  It is derived from the selective breeding of local goats crossed with Saanen goats first introduced to the area in 1904.

References

Dairy goat breeds
Goat breeds originating in China